A testimator is an estimator whose value depends on the result of a test for statistical significance. In the simplest case the value of the final estimator is that of the basic estimator if the test result is significant, and otherwise the value is zero. However more general testimators are possible.

History
An early use of the term "testimator" way made by Brewster & Zidek (1974).

References

Further reading
S. M. Kanbur, C. Ngeow, A. Nanthakumar and R. Stevens (2007). "Investigations of the Nonlinear LMC Cepheid Period‐Luminosity Relation with Testimator and Schwarz Information Criterion Methods", Publications of the Astronomical Society of the Pacific 119, 512–522 online
 Mezbahur Rahman, Gokhale, D.V. (1996) "Testimation in Regression Parameter Estimation", Biometrical Journal, 38 (7), 809–817 online
Abramovich, F., Grinshtein, V., Pensky, M. (2007) "On optimality of Bayesian testimation in the normal means problem", Annals of Statistics, 35, 2261–2286 online

Estimator